Golden is an unincorporated community in Idaho County, Idaho, United States.

History
Golden's population was estimated at 50 in 1960.

References

Unincorporated communities in Idaho County, Idaho
Unincorporated communities in Idaho